Achour Fenni (Arabic: عاشور فني) is an Algerian poet, translator and academician, who has participated in several scientific, cultural and literary meetings in Algeria, North Africa, Europe, North America and South America.

References

External links
 Afenni.blogspot.com
 Afenni.maktoobblog.com
 Transcript-review.org
 Transcript-review.org

Algerian male poets
Algerian translators
French–Arabic translators
Living people
Translators from French
Translators to Arabic
Year of birth missing (living people)
Academic staff of the University of Algiers
21st-century Algerian people